Alexander Anderson Kiddie (27 April 1927 – 27 March 2021) was a Scottish footballer who played for Aberdeen, Falkirk, Arbroath, Brechin City, Montrose and Forfar Athletic as an outside right.

References

1927 births
2021 deaths
Footballers from Dundee
Scottish footballers
Association football outside forwards
Aberdeen F.C. players
Falkirk F.C. players
Scottish Football League players
Celtic F.C. players
Arbroath F.C. players
Brechin City F.C. players
Montrose F.C. players
Forfar Athletic F.C. players